A skeuomorph (also spelled skiamorph) is a derivative object that retains ornamental design cues (attributes) from structures that were necessary in the original. Skeuomorphs are typically used to make something new feel familiar in an effort to speed understanding and acclimation. They employ elements that, while essential to the original object, serve no pragmatic purpose in the new system. Examples include pottery embellished with imitation rivets reminiscent of similar pots made of metal and a software calendar that imitates the appearance of binding on a paper desk calendar.

Definition and purpose 
The term skeuomorph is compounded from the Greek skeuos (σκεῦος), meaning "container or tool", and morphḗ (μορφή), meaning "shape". It has been applied to material objects since 1890. With the advent of computer systems in the 1980s, skeuomorph is used to characterize the many "old fashioned" icons utilized in graphic user interfaces.

A similar alternative definition of skeuomorph is "a physical ornament or design on an object made to resemble another material or technique". This definition is broader in scope, as it can be applied to design elements that still serve the same function as they did in a previous design.

Skeuomorphs may be deliberately employed to make a new look more familiar and comfortable or may be the result of cultural influences and norms on the designer.  They may be the artistic expression on the part of the designer. The usability researcher and academic Don Norman describes skeuomorphism in terms of cultural constraints: interactions with a system that are learned only through culture. Norman also popularized perceived affordances, where the user can tell what an object provides or does based on its appearance, which skeuomorphism can make easy.

The concept of skeuomorphism overlaps with other design concepts. Mimesis is an imitation, coming directly from the Greek word. Archetype is the original idea or model that is emulated, where the emulations can be skeuomorphic. Skeuomorphism is parallel to, but different from, path dependence in technology, where an element's functional behavior is maintained even when the original reasons for its design no longer exist.

Physical examples

Many features of wooden buildings were repeated in stone by the Ancient Greeks when they transitioned from wood to masonry construction. Decorative stone features in the Doric order of classical architecture in Greek temples such as triglyphs, mutules, guttae, and modillions are supposed to be derived from true structural and functional features of the early wooden temples. The triglyph and guttae are seen as recreating in stone functional features of the wooden temples that preceded them, respectively the carved beam-ends and six wooden pegs driven in to secure the beam in place. 
 
Historically, high-status items such as the Minoans' elaborate and expensive silver cups were recreated for a wider market using pottery, a cheaper material. The exchange of shapes between metalwork and ceramics, often from the former to the latter, is near-constant in the history of the decorative arts. Sometimes pellets of clay are used to evoke the rivets of the metal originals.

There is also evidence of skeuomorphism in material transitions. Leather and pottery often carry over features from the wooden counterparts of previous generations. Clay pottery has also been found bearing rope-shaped protrusions, pointing to craftsmen seeking familiar shapes and processes while working with new materials. Another example is the tiny, non-functional handle on glass maple syrup bottles, which evoke stoneware jug handles. In this context, skeuomorphs exist as traits sought in other objects, either for their social desirability or psychological comforts.

In the modern era, cheaper plastic items often attempt to mimic more expensive wooden and metal products, though they are only skeuomorphic if new ornamentation references the original functionality, such as molded screw heads in molded plastic items. Another well-known skeuomorph is the plastic Adirondack chair. The lever on a mechanical slot machine, or "one-armed bandit", is a skeuomorphic throwback feature when it appears on a modern video slot machine, since it is no longer required to set physical mechanisms and gears into motion. Articles of clothing are also given skeuomorphic treatment; for example, faux buckles on certain strap shoes, such as Mary Janes for small children, which permit the retention of the original aesthetic.

Automotive design has historically been full of physical skeuomorphisms, such as thinly chrome-plated plastic components and imitation leather, gold, wood, pearl, or crystal jeweled elements. In The Design of Everyday Things, Don Norman notes that early automobiles were designed after horse-drawn carriages. Indeed, the early automobile design Horsey Horseless even included a wooden horse head on the front. In the 1970s, opera windows and vinyl roofs on many luxury sedan cars similarly imitated carriage work from the horse and buggy era. , most electric cars feature prominent front grilles, even though there is little need for intake of air to cool an absent internal combustion engine.

Virtual examples

Many computer programs have a skeuomorphic graphical user interface that emulates the aesthetics of physical objects. Examples include a digital contact list resembling a Rolodex, and IBM's 1998 RealThings package. A more extreme example is found in some music synthesis and audio processing software packages, which closely emulate physical musical instruments and audio equipment complete with buttons and dials. On a smaller scale, the icons of GUIs may remain skeuomorphic representations of physical objects, such as an image of a physical paper folder to represent computer files. This is even the case for items that are no longer directly applicable to the task they represent (such as a drawing of a floppy disk to represent "save").

Apple Inc., while under the direction of Steve Jobs, was known for its wide usage of skeuomorphic designs in various applications. This changed after Jobs' death when Scott Forstall, described as "the most vocal and high-ranking proponent of the visual design style favored by Mr. Jobs", resigned. Apple designer Jonathan Ive took over some of Forstall's responsibilities and had "made his distaste for the visual ornamentation in Apple's mobile software known within the company". With the announcement of iOS 7 at WWDC in 2013, Apple officially shifted from skeuomorphism to a more simplified design, thus beginning the so-called "death of skeuomorphism" at Apple.

Other virtual skeuomorphs do not employ literal images of some physical object; but rather allude to ritual human heuristics or heuristic motifs, such as slider bars that emulate linear potentiometers and visual tabs that behave like physical tabbed file folders. Another example is the swiping hand gesture for turning the "pages" or screens of a tablet display.

Virtual skeuomorphs can also be auditory. The shutter-click sound emitted by most camera phones when taking a picture is an auditory skeuomorph. Another familiar example is the paper-crumpling sound when a document is trashed.

Some videogames incorporate skeuomorphism in their user interfaces, an example being Highfleet.

Painted lines on the road can serve as skeuomorphs of cattle grids. The light-dark pattern of lines on pavement resembles a true cattle grid to animals, and by association think they will not be able to cross.

In design 

Retrofuturism incorporates visual motifs from old predictions of the future, especially  Skeuomorphic design is frequently incorporated in retrowave or synthwave illustrations. Skeuomorphic design is closely linked with metamodernism.

Skeuomorphic design seems to be preferred by older recipient groups, often referred to as "digital immigrants", while "digital natives" tend to favor flat design over skeuomorphisms. However, younger people are still able to understand the signifiers that skeuomorphic design employs. A better user experience could be measured for each respective design philosophy among digital natives and immigrants.

Arguments in favor 
An argument in favor of skeuomorphic design is that signifiers to affordances help those familiar with the original device learn to use the digital version. Interaction paradigms for computer devices are culturally entrenched; proposals for change often spawn debate. Don Norman describes this process as a form of cultural heritage, and credits skeuomorphism with easing transitions to newer technology, stating that it "gives comfort and makes learning easier" until the newer devices no longer need to resemble their predecessors.

Compared to flat design, skeuomorphic design seems to facilitate a fast navigation through graphic user interfaces, supposedly because icons are more easily recognized and less abstract than their minimalistic counterparts found in flat design.

Arguments against 
The arguments against virtual skeuomorphic design are that skeuomorphic interface elements are harder to operate and take up more screen space than standard interface elements, that this breaks operating system interface design standards, that it causes an inconsistent look and feel between applications, that skeuomorphic interface elements rarely incorporate numeric input or feedback for accurately setting a value, that many users may have no experience with the original device being emulated, that skeuomorphic design can increase cognitive load with visual noise that after a few uses gives little or no value to the user, that skeuomorphic design limits creativity by grounding the user experience to physical counterparts, and that skeuomorphic designs often do not accurately represent underlying system state or data types due to inappropriate mimesis, such as analog gauges in a digital interface.

Gallery

See also 

 Anachronism
 Trompe-l'œil, 2D artwork using realistic optical illusions to simulate three dimensions
 Flat design
 Human interface guidelines
 Intuition

Citations

General references 

 Freeth, C. M., & Taylor, T. F. (2001). Skeuomorphism in Scythia: Deference and Emulation, Olbia ta antichnii svit. Kiev: British Academy; Ukrainian Academy of Sciences. p. 150.

External links

 
 flatisbad.com a selection of user experience studies on skeuomorphism maintained by Lomonosov Moscow State University, Laboratory of Work Psychology

Architectural elements
Computer accessibility
Design
Graphical user interfaces
Industrial design
Product design